The 1982–83 Tunisian Cup (Coupe de Tunisie) was the 27th season of the football cup competition of Tunisia.
The competition was organized by the Fédération Tunisienne de Football (FTF) and open to all clubs in Tunisia.

Round of 32

Round of 16

Quarter-finals

Semi-finals

Final

See also
 1982–83 Tunisian National Championship

References

External links
 Coupe de Tunisie 1982-83
 1982–83 Tunisian Cup at footballvintage.net 

Tunisian Cup
Cup
Tunisia